Popular Republican Union may refer to:

 Popular Republican Union (1919–1946)
 Popular Republican Union (2007)

See also
 Republican Union (disambiguation)